Joel Powhatan Wooldridge (born July 19, 1979) is an American multi national champion and world junior champion in contract bridge as well as an expert foosball player. In 1990, Wooldridge broke Sam Hirschman's previous record for the youngest to achieve Life Master status with the American Contract Bridge League surpassing the mark of 11 years, 9 months and 5 days with a new record of 11 years, 4 months and 13 days. Sam's brother Dan broke Joel's record four years later. Wooldridge lives in New York City.

Bridge accomplishments

Awards
 ACBL King of Bridge 1997
 WBF Youth Award 2003
 ACBL Player of the Year 2011

Wins
 World Junior Teams Championship (3) 2001, 2002, 2005
North American Bridge Championships (10)
Lebhar IMP Pairs (2) 1997, 2013
 Fast Open Pairs (1) 2003
 Chicago Mixed Board-a-Match (1) 2009
 Roth Open Swiss Teams (2) 2009, 2014
 Silodor Open Pairs (1) 2011
 Norman Kay Platinum Pairs (1) 2011
 Von Zedtwitz Life Master Pairs (1) 2017
 Wernher Open Pairs (1) 2017

Runners-up
 World Junior Teams Championship 1999
 World University Team Cup 2006
North American Bridge Championships (9)
Spingold (1) 2005
 Blue Ribbon Pairs (1) 2009
 North American Pairs Flight A (2) 2011, 2018
 Bermuda Bowl (1) 2011
 Chicago Mixed Board-a-Match (1) 2012
 Grand National Teams Championship Flight (2) 2012, 2019
Norman Kay Platinum Pairs (1) 2016

References

External links
 

1979 births
American contract bridge players
Living people
Sportspeople from Buffalo, New York
Sportspeople from New York City